Mykyta Vovchenko (born 21 October 1993) is a Ukrainian professional footballer who plays as a midfielder for Chemik Police.

Career
Vovchenko started his career in 2010 with Kremin Kremenchuk, where he stayed until 2013, featuring in 34 league matches and scoring two goals. In the summer of 2013, he moved to Obolon Kyiv for one season, playing 10 matches and scoring twice. In 2014, Vovchenko joined Poltava until 2016, playing in 19 matches and scored two goals. In 2015, he signed with Desna Chernihiv for one season and playing six matches. In 2019, he moved to Puszcza Niepołomice in Poland, playing five matches in I liga. In the same season, he played one match for III liga side Chemik Police. In the summer of 2020, he moved to Kotwica Kołobrzeg in III liga, with the club finishing the 2020–21 season in 9th place of group II.

Honours
Kremin Kremenchuk
 Ukrainian Second League runner-up: 2009–10

References

External links 
 Mykyta Vovchenko footballfacts.ru
 Mykyta Vovchenko allplayers.in.ua

1993 births
Living people
Ukrainian footballers
Association football midfielders
FC Desna Chernihiv players
FC Kremin Kremenchuk players
FC Obolon-Brovar Kyiv players
FC Poltava players
Puszcza Niepołomice players
Kotwica Kołobrzeg footballers
KP Chemik Police players
Błękitni Stargard players
Ukrainian Second League players
Ukrainian Premier League players
Ukrainian First League players
I liga players
III liga players
Ukrainian expatriate footballers
Ukrainian expatriate sportspeople in Poland
Expatriate footballers in Poland